The Babinet–Soleil compensator is a continuously variable, zero-order retarder. It consists of two birefringent wedges, one of which is movable, and another is fixed to a compensator plate. The orientation of the long axis of the wedges is perpendicular to the long axis of the compensator plate.

References
Iizuka, K (2002). Elements of Photonics, John Wiley & Sons.

Optical components
Polarization (waves)